Clarisse Rasoarizay (born September 27, 1971) is a female long-distance runner from Madagascar, who represented her native African country at the 2004 Summer Olympics in Athens, Greece. She won the women's marathon at the 2003 All-Africa Games in Abuja, Nigeria and the 1997 Jeux de la Francophonie.

Personal bests
5000 metres - 16:20.30 minutes (1998) - national record.
10,000 metres - 33:00.44 minutes (2003) - national record.
Marathon - 2:38:21 hours (2003) - national record.

Achievements

See also
Madagascar at the 2003 All-Africa Games

References

External links

1971 births
Living people
Malagasy female long-distance runners
Olympic athletes of Madagascar
Athletes (track and field) at the 2004 Summer Olympics
Place of birth missing (living people)
Female long jumpers
African Games gold medalists for Madagascar
African Games medalists in athletics (track and field)
Athletes (track and field) at the 2003 All-Africa Games